Chiddushei Rabbeinu Chaim HaLevi Al-HaRambam (Hebrew: חידושי רבינו חיים הלוי על הרמב"ם, lit. Our Rabbi Chaim the Levite's Novellae on Maimonides) is a volume of insights written by Rabbi Chaim Soloveitchik on Maimonides’ Mishneh Torah, it also contains numerous novel understandings of the Talmud. Rabbi Chaim Soloveitchik is known as the founder of the Brisker Derech (also known as Lomdus, the conceptual approach to Talmudic study), and was famous for the brilliant manner with which he reconciled contradictions in Maimonides' writings. The text was written in a very terse style whose intricacy is difficult to decipher even for those very familiar with the Brisker Derech, and was written for those already on a very advanced level of Talmudic and Halachic study. Rabbi Chaim’s son Rabbi Moshe Soloveichik first printed it posthumously in 1936, he stated in the preface that his father wrote it with extreme precision, having “sifted the text seven times over and winnowed it a hundred times more.” Some years later a commentary on Chiddushei Rabbeinu Chaim was written by Rabbi Chaim's student Rabbi Yehezkel Abramsky.

Notes and references

See also
 List of commentaries on Mishneh Torah
 Maimonides
 Brisker Method
 Soloveitchik Dynasty

Commentaries on Mishneh Torah
Sifrei Kodesh